Destroyer escort is the US Navy  classification for a smaller, lightly armed warship designed to be used to escort convoys of merchant marine ships.

Destroyer escort may also refer to:
 , a destroyer escort class of the Japanese Maritime Self-Defense Force
 , a designation given to 78 frigates of the Royal Navy, constructed in the United States
 , a destroyer escort class of the Japanese Maritime Self-Defense Force
 , a class of fleet escorts used by the Kriegsmarine roughly comparable to American destroyer escorts
 , a destroyer escort class of the Japanese Maritime Self-Defense Force
 , a destroyer escort class of the Japanese Maritime Self-Defense Force
 , a class of four escort destroyers operated by the Royal Canadian Navy
 , a class of seven escort destroyers operated by the Royal Canadian Navy
 , a class of six escort destroyers operated by the Royal Australian Navy
 , a class of seven escort destroyers operated by the Royal Canadian Navy
 , a class of destroyer built for the Royal Navy under the War Emergency Programme of the First World War
 , a destroyer escort class of the Japanese Maritime Self-Defense Force

See also
 Escort destroyer (disambiguation)
 Ocean escort, type of United States Navy warship
 Frigate, any of several types of warship